The lesser great leaf-nosed bat or lesser roundleaf bat (Hipposideros turpis) is a species of bat in the family Hipposideridae. It is found in Japan. Its natural habitat is temperate forests.
Human interference has caused rapid habitat destruction, this has caused the bat to become endangered.

Subspecies
H. t. turpis: Yaeyama Islands, Japan, on the 4 islands Iriomote, Ishigaki, Yonaguni, and Hateruma.
H. t. pendleuryi Thailand
H. t. alongensis Vietnam

References
3. Echenique-Diaz, L. M., Yokoyama, J., Kawata, M., Abe, S., & Ishibashi, Y. (2002). Isolation and characterization of microsatellite loci in the Bang’s leaf-nosed bat Hipposideros turpis. Molecular Ecology Notes, 2(4), 396–397. doi:10.1046/j.1471-8286.2002.00250.x          

4. THONG, V. D., PUECHMAILLE, S. J., DENZINGER, A., BATES, P. J. J., DIETZ, C., CSORBA, G., SOISOOK, P., TEELING, E. C., MATSUMURA, S., FUREY, N. M., & SCHNITZLER, H.-U. (2011). Systematics of the Hipposideros turpis complex and a description of a new subspecies from Vietnam. Mammal Review, 42(2), 166–192. doi.org/10.1111/j.1365-2907.2011.00202.x 

Hipposideros
Mammals described in 1901
Bats of Southeast Asia
Taxa named by Outram Bangs
Taxonomy articles created by Polbot